Morning Teleportation is an American psychedelic rock band formed in 2005 when Bowling Green, Kentucky, United States, natives Travis Goodwin (keyboards), Tres Coker (drums), and Paul Wilkerson (bass) met up with Chicago transplant Tiger Merritt (vocals/guitar), who had just moved to their hometown for college. In the last few years they have played at Electric Forest Festival, Bonnaroo Music Festival, and Sasquatch! Music Festival and supported The Flaming Lips, Cage The Elephant, Primus and Modest Mouse.

On April 4, 2019, the band announced through their Facebook page that Tiger Merritt had died.

History
In 2009, the band signed to Glacial Pace Recordings. On March 8, 2011, their debut album, Expanding Anyway, was released on both vinyl and compact disc. The record was produced by Modest Mouse vocalist Isaac Brock.

In 2011, Wilkerson left the band. In 2012, Coker was replaced with Joseph Jones. Alex Lindsey, brother of Mona bassist Zach Lindsey, also joined the band full-time on bass. Also in April 2012, Merritt revealed in an interview that the band had moved back to their hometown, Bowling Green, Kentucky to write  material for their next album.
The band released their second studio album in 2017.

Discography

Studio albums
 Expanding Anyway (2011)
 Salivating for Symbiosis (2017)

References

American psychedelic rock music groups
Musical groups from Portland, Oregon
Musical groups established in 2005
2005 establishments in Kentucky